The Neville Sellwood Stakes is an Australian Turf Club Group 3  Thoroughbred quality handicap horse race, for horses aged four years old and older, over a distance of 2000 metres, held annually at Rosehill Racecourse in Sydney, Australia. Total prize money for the race is A$160,000.

History

The race is named after jockey Neville Sellwood (1922−1962), who rode champions Tulloch and Todman, first Golden Slipper Stakes winner. Sellwood was also victorious in the USA and in 1962 achieved what was perhaps his greatest success, victory on Larkspur in The Derby. Sellwood died after a fall in 1962 at Maisons-Laffitte Racecourse, near Paris, France.

Name

1980–1990 - Neville Sellwood Stakes 
1991–1992 - Five Star Studs Quality Handicap
1993 - Neville Sellwood Stakes
1994–1996 - The Quick-Eze Handicap
1997 - Neville Sellwood Stakes
1998 - Stephenson Food Service Stakes
1999–2009 - Neville Sellwood Stakes
2010 - Canterbury Bankstown Express Neville Sellwood Stakes
2011 - Queen's Cup
2012 - Cellarbrations HKJC Stakes
2013 onwards - Neville Sellwood Stakes

Distance
1980–2009 – 2000 metres
2010 – 1900 metres (held at Canterbury)
2011 onwards - 2000 metres

Grade
1989–2010 - Listed Race
2011 onwards - Group 3

Winners

 2022 - Mount Popa  
 2021 - Shared Ambition
2020 - Night's Watch
2019 - Taikomochi
2018 - Arbeitsam
2017 - Assign
2016 - It's Somewhat
 2015 - Pornichet
 2014 - Junoob
 2013 - Lights of Heaven
 2012 - Western Symbol
 2011 - Syreon
 2010 - Herculian Prince   
 2009 - Ausbred King 
 2008 - Nuclear Sky 
 2007 - Coalesce 
 2006 - Men At Work 
 2005 - Jeremiad
 2004 - Shower Of Roses
 2003 - Heeby Reiby 
 2002 - Youhadyourwarning     
 2001 - Inaflury     
 2000 - Gypsy's Daughter       
 1999 - Inshallah         
 1998 - Star Covet     
 1997 - Seto Stayer      
 1996 - Saranggani      
 1995 - Sky Watch    
 1994 - Protara's Bay      
 1993 - Upwards    
 1992 - Red For Go
 1991 - Native Neptune  
 1990 - Red Chiffon   
 1989 - Round The World
 1988 - Ostensible     
 1987 - Out Of Sight   
 1986 - Beelbangera    
 1985 - Look Aloft     
 1984 - Spring Moss    
 1983 - Il Rubino      
 1982 - Mr Digby       
 1981 - More Mink      
 1980 - Iko

See also
 List of Australian Group races
Group races

External links 
First three placegetters Neville Sellwood Stakes (ATC)

References

Horse races in Australia
Open middle distance horse races